The 2004 season is the 82nd season of competitive football in Ecuador.

National leagues

Serie A

Champion: Deportivo Cuenca (1st title)
International cup qualifiers:
2005 Copa Libertadores: Deportivo Cuenca, Olmedo, LDU Quito
2004 Copa Sudamericana: LDU Quito, Aucas
Relegated: Macará, ESPOLI

Serie B
Winner: Deportivo Quevedo (3rd title)
Promoted: Deportivo Quevedo, LDU Loja
Relegated: Deportivo Saquisilí, Audaz Octubrino

Segunda
Winner: Tungurahua
Promoted: Tungurahua, Esmeraldas Petrolero

Clubs in international competitions

National teams

Senior team

2006 FIFA World Cup qualifiers

Ecuador continued their 2006 FIFA World Cup qualifying in 2006.

Copa América

Ecuador was drawn into Group B with Argentina, Mexico, and Uruguay. They finished 4th in the group and were eliminated from the tournament.

Friendlies

Notes
1.Ecuador fielded its U-23 team, but the match is listed as a full international by FIFA.

External links
 National leagues details on RSSSF
 National teams details on RSSSF

 
2004